Sun Girl, in comics, may refer to:

Sun Girl (Marvel Comics), a superheroine
Sun Girl (DC Comics), a supervillainess